Municipality of Sinaloa is a municipality in the state of Sinaloa in northwestern Mexico. Its seat is Sinaloa de Leyva.

Political subdivision 
Sinaloa Municipality is subdivided in 9 sindicaturas:
Bacubirito
Estación Naranjo
Lázaro Cárdenas (Ejido Ruiz Cortines No. 1)
Llano Grande
Maquipo
Ocoroni
Palmar de los Sepúlveda
San José de Gracia
San José de las Delicias

Economy
Agriculture is one of the three main economical activities in this municipality, with cultivation of maize, beans, soy, wheat, sorghum, tomato and sesame representing the main preferences.
Cattle farming is another of the three activities, with 6820 registered cattle farmers, as well as 52235 heads of cattle. In a much more reduced quantity, pigs are reared, as well as domestic birds.
The industrial aspect of the economy consists of a furniture factory, as well as a hydroelectric plant belonging to CFE.

References

Municipalities of Sinaloa

pt:Sinaloa (Sinaloa)